The  is a toll road in Miyagi Prefecture, Japan. It is owned and operated by the East Nippon Expressway Company (NEXCO East Japan). Along with the Sanriku Expressway, Sendai-Tōbu Road, Sendai-Nanbu Road, and Tōhoku Expressway it forms a ring road around the city, Sendai, known as the "Gurutto Sendai". The route is signed E6 under Ministry of Land, Infrastructure, Transport and Tourism's  "2016 Proposal for Realization of Expressway Numbering."

History
The first section of Sendai-Hokubu Road to open was the  section between the road's eastern terminus at the Sanriku Expressway and Rifu-Shirakashidai Interchange on 19 May 2002. At the time, there was no access to the northbound lanes of the Sanriku Expressway and from the southbound lanes to eastbound Sendai-Hokubu Road, this has since been fixed.
The toll road was damaged on 11 March 2011 during the 2011 Tōhoku earthquake and tsunami. Inspections after the disaster showed that the road had sunken in places due to soil liquefaction. The damage was repaired within the two weeks after the event.

Junction list
The entire expressway is in Miyagi Prefecture.

See also

Japan National Route 47

References

External links

 East Nippon Expressway Company

Toll roads in Japan
Roads in Miyagi Prefecture
2002 establishments in Japan